There are at least 34 named mountains in Deer Lodge County, Montana.
 Bear Mountain, el. 
 Beaverhead Mountain, el. 
 Blizzard Hill, el. 
 Cottonwood Mountain, el. 
 East Goat Peak, el. 
 East Pintler Peak, el. 
 Fish Peak, el. 
 Garrity Mountain, el. 
 Gospel Hill, el. 
 Grassy Mountain, el. 
 Grouse Hill, el. 
 Hidden Lake Hill, el. 
 Johnson Hill, el. 
 Long Peak, el. 
 McGlaughlin Peak, el. 
 Mount Evans (Montana), el. 
 Mount Haggin, el. 
 Mount Howe, el. 
 Needle Peak, el. 
 Nipple Peak, el. 
 Olson Mountain, el. 
 Orofino Mountain, el. 
 Pine Hill, el. 
 Pintler Peak, el. 
 Queener Mountain, el. 
 Saddle Mountain, el. 
 Saratoga Mountain, el. 
 Short Peak, el. 
 Silver Hill, el. 
 Spring Hill, el. 
 Sugarloaf Mountain, el. 
 Tower Peak, el. 
 West Goat Peak, el. 
 Wraith Hill, el.

See also
 List of mountains in Montana
 List of mountain ranges in Montana

Notes

Landforms of Deer Lodge County, Montana
Deer Lodge